The Baltimore Outer Beltway was a proposed freeway that would encircle parts of the Greater Baltimore area.

Parts of it have been built as the following roads:
Maryland Route 100 (22.1 miles)
US 29 (4 miles)
Maryland Route 43 (5.5 Miles)

Roads in Maryland

References